John Cogswell is an American clinical psychologist who practices psychotherapy in Los Angeles. He started his career as chief psychologist at the Brattleboro Retreat in Brattleboro, Vermont.

He was trained by William Snyder who, under Carl Rogers, conducted the first research investigation in psychotherapy. In 1959, at System Development Corporation Cogswell pioneered the first study in computer-assisted counseling. In 1965, caught between the "objective" psychologist and the subjective self, he sought therapy with James Bugental. This therapy produced a transpersonal experience that markedly altered his view of reality. Since 1968 he has pursued meditation, Vajrayana Buddhism, Jungian theory and Bioenergetic therapy. Through 1982-2002 he trained with Tibetan lamas and took his Bodhisattva vows with the Venerable Trungram Gyaltrul Rinpoche.

He is the co-founder with Joseph Culp of the body/mind approach Walking-In-Your-Shoes and the L.A.-based Walking Theatre Group.

References

External links
 Walking-In-Your-Shoes™

Living people
21st-century American psychologists
Place of birth missing (living people)
Year of birth missing (living people)
American psychotherapists
People from Los Angeles